Dymi or Dyme may refer to:
Dymi, Achaea, a municipal unit in Achaea, Greece
Ancient Dyme, Greece, Achaea
Dymi, Rhodope, part of the municipal unit of Sostis, Rhodope regional unit, Greece
Dymi, Russia, name of several rural localities in Russia